Phrurolithidae is a family of araneomorph spiders first described by Nathan Banks in 1892. First included in the Corinnidae as the subfamily Phrurolithinae, later phylogenetic studies justified a separate family.

Genera

, the World Spider Catalog accepts the following genera:

Abdosetae Fu, Zhang & MacDermott, 2010 — Indonesia
Aculithus Liu & S. Q. Li, 2022 — China
Alboculus Liu, 2020 — China
Bosselaerius Zamani & Marusik, 2020 — Asia
Corealithus Kamura, 2021 — Asia
Dorymetaecus Rainbow, 1920 — Australia
Edelithus Liu & Li, 2022 — Asia
Grandilithus Liu & S. Q. Li, 2022 — China
Labialithus Kamura, 2021 — Asia
Lingulatus Mu & Zhang, 2022 — Asia
Liophrurillus Wunderlich, 1992 — Europe, North Africa
Lunalithus Kamura, 2022 — Japan
Otacilia Thorell, 1897 — Asia
Pennalithus Kamura, 2021 — Asia
Phonotimpus Gertsch & Davis, 1940 — Mexico
Phrurolinillus Wunderlich, 1995 — Portugal, Spain
Phrurolithus C. L. Koch, 1839 — North America, Asia, Europe, Cuba
Phruronellus Chamberlin, 1921 — United States
Phrurotimpus Chamberlin & Ivie, 1935 — United States, Canada
Piabuna Chamberlin & Ivie, 1933 — United States, Mexico
Plynnon Deeleman-Reinhold, 2001 — Indonesia
Scotinella Banks, 1911 — United States, Canada
Xiaoliguang Lin & Li, 2023 — Vietnam
Xilithus Lin & Li, 2023 — China, Japan

See also
 List of Phrurolithidae species

References

 
Araneomorphae families